The Turks in Kosovo, also known as Kosovo Turks, and Kosovan Turks, are the ethnic Turks who constitute a minority group in Kosovo.

History
Turkish settlement into Kosovo began in the late 14th century after the medieval Serbian state lost the Battle of Kosovo and the territory came under Ottoman rule. Although Turkish colonists began arriving in 1389-1455 when, during the Ottoman conquest, numbers of soldiers, officials, and merchants began to make their appearance in the major towns of Kosovo, the overwhelming majority of modern Turks in Kosovo are of Albanian origin.

During Ottoman rule, the cities of Prizren, Mitrovica, Vushtrri, Gjilan and Pristina experienced a widespread phenomenon where villagers settling in the cities would, upon arrival, begin adopting Turkish customs and the Turkish language. Those who settled in these urban environments, where Turkish was the language of communication with the government and the language of social prestige, opted to refer to themselves as Turks, in order to distinguish themselves from those who had not migrated to the cities and as a marker of socioeconomic status. A large number of these Turkified inhabitants still retain names alluding to their ethnic Albanian origin, usually consisting of tribal names such as  Berisha, Bytyçi, Gashi, Hoti, Kastrati, Krasniqi, Kryeziu, Luma and others.

In 1912 the Ottoman Turks lost control over Kosovo and the region became a part of the Kingdoms of Serbia and Montenegro. From this point, Kosovo as a political entity was discontinued as the region was divided among new administrative units. Following the Austrian and Bulgarian occupation during World War I, Serbia and Montenegro became part of the newly created Kingdom of Serbs, Croats and Slovenes in 1918. When the Axis powers occupied Yugoslavia in 1941, the former territory of Kosovo became part of Albania, which was itself controlled by Italy. With the defeat of the Axis powers, Yugoslavia, then ruled by Communists led by Josip Broz Tito, regained control over the region. In 1946, Kosovo returned to maps when a region bearing the name Kosovo and Metohija was granted autonomous status within FPR Yugoslavia.

As a result of the Turkification policies enacted by the Yugoslavian government between 1948-1956, the number of registered Turks in Kosovo jumped from a mere 1,313 (or 0.2% of the population) in 1948 to 34,343 (4.3% of Kosovo's population) in the 1953 census. This was partly the result of the historical connotations of the word Turk, which had been synonymous with Muslim during the Ottoman era. These self declared Turks, almost exclusively consisting of ethnic Albanians, then began to emigrate to Turkey until 1958 on the basis of a bilateral agreement between Yugoslavia and Turkey.

Demographics

Population
In 1993, the Human Rights Watch stated that there was approximately 20,000 Kosovan Turks, constituting about 1% of Kosovo's population. More recent estimates suggest that there are now about 29,000 to 30,000 Turks living in Kosovo, forming between 1-2% of Kosovo's total population. According to the 2011 census 18,738 citizens declared themselves as Turks, constituting 1.1% of Kosovo's total population. The European Centre for minority Issues Kosovo has stated that:

Areas of settlement
The Turkish minority of Kosovo have a majority population in Mamusha. However, the largest Turkish population in Kosovo live in Prizren. They constitute roughly 5% of Prizren's population, and the town remains the historical, cultural and political centre of the Kosovan Turkish community. In the Gjilan municipality, the Turkish community resides mostly in the town of Gjilane and in the villages of Livoç i Epërm/Gornji Livoč and Dobërçan/Dobrčane, constituting between 0.9-1.1% of the total population of the municipality. Kosovan Turks living in Mitrovica amount to roughly 1.5% of its total population; in the southern part of the town, Kosovan Turks live scattered in the city, while those who live in northern region reside in the "Bosniak Mahalla" neighbourhood. In Vushtrri Turks constitute about 0.9% of the total population, and live scattered throughout the urban areas. In the Pristina region together with Turkish speaking Muslim Roma the Divanjoldjije Group, they are concentrated in the urban areas of the city, and constitute roughly 0.4% of the total municipal population, and in the rural settlements of Janjevo and Banullë/Bandulić in the Lipjan municipality, where they amount to 0.5% of the population.

Turkish population in Kosovo according to the 2011 census (Turkish majority in bold):

Politics 
There are three Turkish political parties in Kosovo:

Turkish Public Front- under the leadership of Sezai Saipi
Turkish Democratic Union- under the leadership of Erhan Köroğlu, centred in Pristina
Turkish Democratic Party of Kosovo (KTDP)- under the leadership of Mahir Yağcılar, centred in Prizren (the only registered Turkish party of Kosovo)

Notable Kosovo Turks
, politician
Gülsha Adilji, Swiss TV presenter (Turkish-Kosovar mother)
, businessman 
, politician 
, politician
, cartoonist 
, writer
, politician
, writer, poet and short story writer
, community leader
Aşık Çelebi, biographer, poet, and translator
Prizrenli Suzi Çelebi, poet and historiographer
Fahrettin Durak, football player
, poet and writer 
Cafer Tayyar Eğilmez, officer of the Ottoman Army and a general of the Turkish Army
Melih Gökçek, mayor of Ankara (1994-2017)
, literary scholar and Turcologist
, military general
Adnan Januzaj, Belgian football player 
, singer and actress
Hikmet Kıvılcımlı, communist leader, theoretician, writer, publicist, and translator
Abdülhadi Krasniç, mayor of Mamuša
Edvin Kurtulus, Swedish football player 
, politician
, poet and writer 
, writer, cartoonist, screenwriter, director and presenter 
Ahmet Samim, journalist and liberal politician; founding member of the Ottoman Liberty Party
Ali Haydar Şen, businessman
Naci Şensoy, football manager and former player
Yahya Kemal Beyatlı, Turkish poet and author, as well as a politician and diplomat
, politician
, politician
, former president of Fenerbahçe S.K. 
Güner Ureya, first Ambassador of the Republic of Kosovo to the People's Republic of Bangladesh
, writer, poet and short story writer
, businessman 
Mahir Yağcılar, President of the Turkish Democratic Party of Kosovo

Ottoman architecture

See also the Mosque of Muderis Ali Efendi

See also
Turkish minorities in the former Ottoman Empire
Turks in Serbia
Turks in the Balkans
Mamuša
Turkish Democratic Party of Kosovo
Kosovo–Turkey relations
Turkification

References

Bibliography 
 
.
.
.
.
.
.
.
.

Ethnic groups in Kosovo
Kosovo
Kosovo
Turkish diaspora in Europe